The first edition of the ATP tournament in Umag was held from 14 May until 20 May 1990.

Vojtěch Flégl and Daniel Vacek won the title by defeating Andrei Cherkasov and Andrei Olhovskiy 6–4, 6–4 in the final.

Seeds

Draw

Draw

References

External links
 Official results archive (ATP)
 Official results archive (ITF)

Croatia Open - Doubles
1990 Doubles
1990 in tennis